Renato Palm da Silveira (born 14 October 1991) is a Brazilian professional footballer who plays as a centre-back.

Career
Silveira joined Persian Gulf Pro League Sepahan in July 2022 on a two-year contract.

References

1991 births
Living people
Brazilian footballers
Association football central defenders
Campeonato Brasileiro Série B players
Campeonato Brasileiro Série C players
Campeonato Brasileiro Série D players
Persian Gulf Pro League players
Esporte Clube Cruzeiro players
Luverdense Esporte Clube players
Ituano FC players
Avaí FC players
Santa Cruz Futebol Clube players
Associação Atlética Caldense players
Esporte Clube Água Santa players
Clube Recreativo e Atlético Catalano players
Associação Atlética Aparecidense players
Clube Atlético Penapolense players
Vila Nova Futebol Clube players
Sepahan S.C. footballers
Brazilian expatriate footballers
Brazilian expatriate sportspeople in Iran
Expatriate footballers in Iran